Outa Hand is an album by Canadian band Coney Hatch. It was released in 1983.

Track listing
"Don't Say Make Me" 4:16
"Shake It" 3:32
"First Time for Everything" 3:48
"Some Like it Hot" 2:56
"To Feel the Feeling Again" 4:13
"Too Far Gone" 3:57
"Love Games" 3:33
"Fallen Angel" 3:27
"Music of the Night" 5:41

The 2006 remaster added three bonus tracks:
"Nobody Gives You" 3:01
"Your Kinda Love" 3:29
"Fly On" (demo) 4:18

Personnel

Coney Hatch
Carl Dixon – rhythm guitar, lead vocals
Andy Curran – bass guitar, lead vocals on tracks 2, 4, 7, 8 and 11 (bonus on 2006 remaster)
Steve Shelski – lead guitar, vocals
Dave "Thumper" Ketchum – drums, percussion

Additional Personnel
Peter Fredette: Lead guitar and backing vocals on tracks 3 and 9

References

1983 albums
Coney Hatch albums
Albums produced by Max Norman